Pieve Tesino (La Piève in local dialect) is a comune (municipality) in Trentino in the northern Italian region Trentino-Alto Adige/Südtirol, located about  east of Trento.

Pieve Tesino borders the following municipalities: Tesero, Panchià, Ziano di Fiemme, Cavalese, Castello-Molina di Fiemme, Canal San Bovo, Castello Tesino, Telve, Scurelle, Cinte Tesino, Bieno, Strigno, Ivano-Fracena and Ospedaletto.

Demographic evolution

References

Cities and towns in Trentino-Alto Adige/Südtirol